Anzhelika Terliuga (born March 23, 1992) is a Ukrainian karateka competing in the kumite 55 kg division.

Career
She won the silver medal in the women's 55 kg event at the 2020 Summer Olympics in Tokyo, Japan. She won the gold medal in the women's 55 kg event at the 2022 World Games held in Birmingham, United States. She is also a multiple European champion and medalist, 2017 Grand winner Karate 1 Premier League of the Female Kumite (-55 kg).

In November 2021, she competed in the women's 55 kg event at the 2021 World Karate Championships held in Dubai, United Arab Emirates.

References

External links 

 
 

1992 births
Living people
Ukrainian female karateka
European champions for Ukraine
European Games medalists in karate
Karateka at the 2019 European Games
European Games silver medalists for Ukraine
Karateka at the 2020 Summer Olympics
Olympic karateka of Ukraine
Olympic medalists in karate
Medalists at the 2020 Summer Olympics
Olympic silver medalists for Ukraine
Competitors at the 2022 World Games
World Games gold medalists
World Games medalists in karate
Sportspeople from Odesa
21st-century Ukrainian women